Flashing Steeds is a 1925 American silent Western film directed by Horace B. Carpenter and starring Bill Patton, Dorothy Donald and Merrill McCormick.

Cast
 Bill Patton as Bill Swift  
 Dorothy Donald as Girlie Hart  
 Merrill McCormick as Lord Algernon Rathburne  
 Ethel Childers as Lady Rathburne  
 Alfred Hewston as 'Shorty' Travers  
 Dick La Reno as 'Cap' Hart  
 Harry O'Connoras Joe Stern  
 Pat Patton as One Lung, the cook

References

Bibliography
 Pitts, Michael R. Western Movies: A Guide to 5,105 Feature Films. McFarland, 2012.

External links
 

1925 films
1925 Western (genre) films
Chesterfield Pictures films
American black-and-white films
Silent American Western (genre) films
1920s English-language films
1920s American films